This page lists the winners and nominees for the Soul Train Music Sammy Davis Jr. Award for Entertainer of the Year. At times the award was given out twice in a year, honoring male and female artists separately. Beyoncé was the only artist to have won this award twice in the show's history (once solo and once with Destiny's Child) until 2009, when Michael Jackson was posthumously awarded his second Entertainer of the Year.

Winners
Winners are listed first and highlighted in bold.

1980s

1990s

2000s

References

Soul Train Music Awards